The Venezuelan Rugby Federation ( (FVR)) is the governing body of rugby union in Venezuela. It was founded in 1992. It is a member of World Rugby since 1998 and Sudamérica Rugby.

The Venezuelan Rugby Federation was recognised by the Venezuelan Ministry of Sport in 2005. It was admitted by the Venezuelan Olympic Committee on 1 February 2010.

See also
 Rugby union in Venezuela
 Venezuela national rugby union team
 Venezuela national rugby union team (sevens)
 Venezuela women's national rugby union team (sevens)
 Campeonato Nacional de Clubes

References

External links
   Official site

Rugby union in Venezuela
Rugby
Rugby union governing bodies in South America
World Rugby members
Sports organizations established in 1992